George Cameron Wyllie, GC (25 December 1908 – 1 February 1987) of the Royal Engineers was awarded the George Cross for the heroism he displayed on 12 September 1940 when a  bomb fell near St Paul's Cathedral in Deans Yard. It took three days to dig the bomb out of soft soil, work made even more dangerous by a fire at a fractured gas main.

The citation from a supplement to The London Gazette of 27 September 1940 (dated 30 September 1940) reads:

References

Further reading
 
 Jappy, Melanie (2001) Danger UXB Channel Four Books.

External links
 Royal Engineers bomb disposal history page

British recipients of the George Cross
British Army personnel of World War II
Royal Engineers soldiers
1987 deaths
1908 births
Bomb disposal personnel